The Roger Nimier Prize is a French literature award. It is supposed to go to "a young author whose spirit is in line with the literary works of Roger Nimier". Nimier (1925–1962) was a novelist and a leading member of the Hussards movement. The prize was established in 1963 at the initiative of André Parinaud and Denis Huisman and is handed out annually during the second half of May. It comes with a sum of 5000 euro.

Recipients 
 1963: Jean Freustié for La Passerelle, Éditions Grasset
 1964: André de Richaud for Je ne suis pas mort, Éditions France-Empire
 1966: Clément Rosset for Lettre sur les chimpanzés, Éditions Gallimard
 1967: Éric Ollivier for J'ai cru trop longtemps aux vacances, Éditions Denoël
 1968: Patrick Modiano for La Place de l'Étoile, Gallimard
 1969: Michel Doury for L'Indo, Éditions Julliard
 1970: Robert Quatrepoint for Mort d'un Grec, Denoël
 1971: François Sonkin for Les Gendres, Denoël
 1972: ex-aequo Claude Breuer for Une journée un peu chaude, Éditions France-Empire
 1972: ex-aequo André Thirion for Révolutionnaires sans révolution, Éditions Robert Laffont
 1973: Inès Cagnati for Le jour de congé, Denoël
 1974: François Weyergans for Le Pitre, Gallimard
 1975: Frédéric Musso for La Déesse, La Table Ronde
 1976: Alexandre Astruc for Ciel de cendres, 
 1977: Emil Cioran for all his work
 1978: Érik Orsenna for La Vie comme à Lausanne, Éditions du Seuil
 1979: Pascal Sevran for Le Passé supplémentaire, 
 1980: Gérard Pussey for L'Homme d'intérieur, Denoël
 1981: Bernard Frank for Solde, Flammarion
 1982: Jean Rolin for Journal de Gand aux Aléoutiennes, JC Lattès
 1983: Denis Tillinac for L'Été anglais, Robert Laffont
 1984: Didier Van Cauwelaert for Poisson d'amour, Seuil
 1985: Antoine Roblot for Un beau match, La Table Ronde
 1986: Jacques-Pierre Amette for Confessions d'un enfant gâté, Olivier Orban
 1987: Alain Dugrand for Une certaine sympathie, JC Lattès
 1988: Jean-Claude Guillebaud for Le Voyage à Kéren, Arléa
 1989: Frédéric Berthet for Daimler s'en va, La Table ronde
 1990: Éric Neuhoff for Les Hanches de Lætitia, Albin Michel
 1991: Stéphane Hoffmann for Château Bougon, Albin Michel
 1992: François Taillandier for Les Nuits Racine, 
 1993: Dominique Muller for C'était le paradis, Seuil
 1994: Stéphane Denis for Les événements de 67, Plon
 1995: Dominique Noguez for Les Martagons, Gallimard
 1996: Éric Holder for En compagnie des femmes, 
 1997: Jean-Paul Kauffmann for La Chambre noire de Longwood: le voyage à Sainte-Hélène, La Table ronde
 1998: Jérôme Garcin for La Chute de cheval, Gallimard
 1999: Marc Dugain for The Officers' Ward (La Chambre des officiers), JC Lattès
 2000: Arnaud Guillon for Écume Palace, Arléa
 2001: Charles Dantzig for Nos vies hâtives, Grasset
 2002: Nicolas d'Estienne d'Orves alias Néo for Othon ou l'aurore immobile, Manitoba-Les Belles lettres
 2003: Marie-Claire Pauwels for Fille à papa, Albin Michel
 2004: ex-aequo David Foenkinos for Le Potentiel érotique de ma femme, Gallimard
 2004: ex-aequo Adrien Goetz for La Dormeuse de Naples, 
 2005: Bernard Chapuis for La Vie parlée, Stock
 2006: Christian Authier for Les liens défaits, Stock
 2007: Jean-Marc Parisis for Avant, pendant, après, Stock
 2008: Yannick Haenel for Cercle, L'Infini
 2009: Xavier Patier for Le silence des termites, La Table Ronde
 2010: Nelly Alard for Le Crieur de nuit, Gallimard
 2011: Françoise Dorner for Tartelettes, jarretelles et bigorneaux, Albin Michel
 2012: Jean-Luc Coatalem for Le Gouverneur d'Antipodia, Le Dilettante
 2013: Capucine Motte for Apollinaria, JC Lattès
 2014: David Le Bailly for La Captive de Mitterrand, Stock
 2015: Émilie de Turckheim for La Disparition du nombril, 
 2016: Paul Greveillac for Les Âmes rouges, Gallimard

References 

Awards established in 1963
French literary awards
1963 establishments in France